The qualification for the 2019 European Baseball Championship started on July 25, 2016 in Ljubljana, Slovenia and Miejska Górka, Poland. The tournament was originally planned for 2018, but was moved back a year to 2019 to serve as a qualification for the 2020 Olympiad.

2016 Pool C

Miejska Górka Group

Final

Final standings

Ljubljana Group

Final

Final standings

2017 Pool B

Top team from each group qualified for the playoff, winner of which (Austria) qualified for the 2019 European Baseball Championship, bottom team from each group was relegated to C-Pool.

Pool 1 – Belgrade

Final

Final standings

Pool 2 – Miejska Górka

Final

Final standings

2018 Playoff Series
Winner of the best-of-three playoff series qualified for the 2019 European Baseball Championship. Playoffs were hosted by Wiener Neustadt.

 qualified for the 2019 European Baseball Championship.

2018 Pool C

Two groups of 5 nations competed, with the winner of each group advancing to the B-Pool. The better of the two second-place teams (based on record, with first tie-breaker based on runs per inning differential) also advanced to the B Pool as a wild card.

Ashbourne Group

Final
The final was a rematch of Ireland vs. Greece; Ireland won the group round game 10–0 in eight innings and the final 12–2. Ireland advanced to Pool B as the winner. Greece, as the runner-up, also advanced as the wild card after Ukraine beat Romania in the Kropyvnytskyi group. Greece's 3–1 record in group play was better than Romania's 2–2 record.

Final standings

Kropyvnytskyi Group

The three-way tie between Romania, Georgia, and Estonia at 2–2 was won by Romania with a Team Quality Balance within games played between those three teams of 0.5125 against Georgia's -.0625 and Estonia's −0.4183.

Final
The final was a rematch between Ukraine and Romania; Ukraine won the group round game 13–0 in seven innings and the final 3–2 (again in seven innings, due to weather). Ukraine, as the winner, advanced to Pool B. The better runner-up between the two groups also advanced, but Romania's 2–2 record in group play was worse than that of 3–1 Greece (the Ashbourne group runner-up).

Final standings

2019 Pool B

Pool B featured 14 teams competing in two groups of 6 and 8 teams. The two group winners faced off in the playoff for the last qualifying spot for the 2019 European Championship, which was won by Team Israel.

Teams
Nine teams remain from the 2017 Pool B competition:

 
 
 
 
 
 
 
 
 

Five additional teams advanced from 2018 Pool C.

Group 1 - Trnava

Pool A

Pool B

Play-offs

Semifinals
Semifinals order will be switched, because home team advanced to this round.

3rd-place game

Final

Classification round – Pool C

Final standings

Group 2 - Blagoevgrad

Final

Final standings

2019 Playoff Series
The winner of the best-of-three playoff series qualified for the 2019 European Baseball Championship. Playoff host was Utena, Lithuania.

 qualified for the 2019 European Baseball Championship.

References

External links
CEB official site
2016 Pool C Miejska Górka Site
2016 Pool C Ljubljana Site
2017 Pool B Belgrade Site
2017 Pool B Miejska Gorká Site
2018 Playoff series Site
2018 Pool C Ashbourne Site
2018 Pool C Kropyvnytskyi Site
2019 Pool B Trnava Site
2019 Pool B Blagoevgrad Site

2019 European Baseball Championship
Qualifier European Baseball Championship
Qualifier European Baseball Championship
Qualifier European Baseball Championship
Qualifier European Baseball Championship
European Baseball Championship – Qualification